Murder in Mind is a British television anthology series of self-contained stories, each with a murderous theme, seen from the perspective of the murderer. The series was created by Anthony Horowitz, and broadcast on BBC One from 22 April 2001 to 29 June 2003.

Murder in Mind featured different actors in every episode, and ran for a total of three series, incorporating 23 episodes. A nine-disc DVD boxset, containing all three series, was released in June 2005.

Episodes

Series 1 (2001)

Series 2 (2002)

Series 3 (2003)

References

External links 
 
 
 

2001 British television series debuts
2003 British television series endings
2000s British anthology television series
2000s British crime drama television series
BBC anthology television shows
BBC crime television shows
BBC television dramas
English-language television shows
Murder in television